Karl Sanders (born June 5, 1963) is an American vocalist and guitarist, most widely known as the founding member of the ancient Egyptian-themed technical death metal band Nile.

Early life 
Before creating Nile, Sanders was in a thrash metal band during the late 1980s called Morriah and played local shows with the young Morbid Angel and other US death metal bands.

Other projects 
Sanders began his own solo side project in 2004. Much of the music that he plays includes similar elements of his band Nile, however presented in an ambient/Egyptian folk format, rather than death metal. Sanders explained that "he got sick of hearing big loud death metal everyday after touring", and started writing quieter music to relax, and recorded them.

His first solo full-length album, Saurian Meditation, was released in October 2004 under the Relapse record label. A second solo album, Saurian Exorcisms, was released in April 2009. In May 2022, he announced his third solo album, Saurian Apocalypse, would be released on July 22.

Equipment

According to Sanders in the official Nile forum and in an article on MetalSucks, the equipment he uses is:

Guitars
Dean V Nile Custom
Dean 79 V
Dean ML
Dean VX
KxK Spear V
 1973 Fender Strat with Warmoth "Jackson" neck
Natural finish KxK Double-Neck V - Top neck fretless 11 string, bottom neck in drop A
Dark finish KxK Double-Neck V - Top neck in drop D, bottom neck in drop A (Was recently sold on eBay)
KxK Seven string V
Godin Glissentar
Godin ACS Slim Solidbody Classical
Dean 12-string acoustic
Handmade Turkish bağlama saz

Pickups
Seymour Duncan Invader (Main bridge pickup) 
Seymour Duncan Distortion (Alternate bridge pickup)
Seymour Duncan Full Shred (Neck pickup)
Seymour Duncan Pearly Gates (Neck pickup)

Strings
SIT .070 .050 .038 .017 .012 .010

Picks
Dunlop Tortex Sharp 1.35 mm

Amps
ENGL Invader (Current main amplifier)
Marshall JCM 2000 DSL 100 heads (Previous main amplifier, and backup for Engl)
Marshall 1960 a/b cabs with Celestion 65 watt Creamback speakers
Splawn Quickrod (Main amp used for recording At The Gates of Sethu)

Other equipment
Roland GP-8
Lexicon Digital Reverb
Roland GR-1 Guitar synth
Roland PK-5 Midi Pedals
Customized Dell Vostro *Sonar and Kontact software
 M-audio Interface
Glyph Porta Drive
MOTU interface
Radial Tonebone Plexi Pedal
Radial Direct Boxes
Radial JD-7
Monster Cable

Guest appearances 
Sanders guested on Behemoth's 2004 CD release, Demigod, playing a guitar solo on the track "XUL". He also performed a guitar solo at the end of the track "God of Our Own Divinity" by Morbid Angel, on their 2003 album Heretic, as well as a solo on the song "The Final War (Battle of Actium)" on Ex Deo's 2009 album Romulus.
Sanders also played on Grave's 2010 album Burial Ground on the tracks "Bloodtrail" and "Naafa". Sanders traveled to Dubai to collaborate on guest vocals for Nervecell's song "Shunq (To the Despaired... King of Darkness)" on their 2011 album Psychogenocide.  On Tourniquet's 2012 album Antiseptic Bloodbath, Sanders contributed a guitar solo to the track "Chamunda Temple Stampede". Sanders was also featured in episode one of Rusty Cooley's and Zachary Adkins' podcast "Guitar Autopsy" available on YouTube.
In 2017 Sanders traveled to Egypt to collaborate with Nader Sadek, Derek Roddy, and Mahmud Gecekusu on The Serapeum EP
In 2018 Sanders did a guest solo on the song "Sacred War of Lawlessness" for Polish Blackened Death Metal Band Veld 
Sanders provided lead guitars for THŪN's self-titled EP in 2021.

Personal life
He has a son named Kael who appeared as a guest vocalist on Nile (band)'s 2019 album Vile Nilotic Rites.

Discography

With Nile

References

External links

Living people
Lead guitarists
American heavy metal guitarists
American heavy metal keyboardists
American heavy metal singers
20th-century American singers
21st-century American singers
1963 births
American multi-instrumentalists
20th-century American guitarists
Death metal musicians